Sharlykbash (Şarlıqbaş) is a rural locality (a village) in Ziriklinsky Selsoviet, Sharansky District, Bashkortostan, Russia. The population was 75 as of 2010. There is 1 street.

Geography 
Sharlykbash is located 22 km west of Sharan (the district's administrative centre) by road. Zirikly is the nearest rural locality.

References 

Rural localities in Sharansky District